The 22nd Awit Awards were held on December 7, 2009 at the Filoil Flying V Arena, San Juan. They honored the achievements in the Philippine music industry for the year 2008.

Gary Valenciano led the nominations with thirteen. Rico Blanco and Jonathan Manalo followed with eight.  They were followed by Bamboo and Itchyworms with six nods.

The awards show was broadcast live through Ustream, an online video streaming service. Itchyworms won most of the awards with four. A two-hour concert was held right after the awards ceremony.

Winners and nominees
Winners are listed first and highlighted in bold. Nominated producers, composers and lyricists are not included in this list, unless noted.

Performance Awards

Creativity Awards

Technical Achievement Awards

People's Choice Awards

Special Award

References

External links
 Official Website of the Awit Awards

Awit Awards
2009 music awards
2009 in Philippine music